Hmong Today (Xov-Xwm Hmoob) is a U.S. nationwide newspaper documenting the news and culture of the Hmong American community. It is published biweekly and based in St. Paul, Minnesota.

The publisher of the newspaper is Sang Moua and the president of the company is Sy Vang. In 2022, archives of Hmong Today were included in an expansion of the Hmong Cultural Center Museum in St Paul, MN.

Awards
At the Ethnic and Community Media Awards in 2008, Wameng Moua received honors for stories in two categories.

References

External links

 Hmong Today

Hmong-American culture in Minneapolis–Saint Paul
Hmong-American culture and history
National newspapers published in the United States
Newspapers published in Minnesota